Agnes Bruckner is an American actress and former model. She began acting in television in the late 1990s and has since appeared in several films, including The Woods, Blue Car, Murder by Numbers, Blood and Chocolate, The Anna Nicole Story, The 11th Green, and Private Practice.

Early life
Bruckner was born in Los Angeles, California to a Hungarian father and a Russian mother who have since divorced; her grandfather is German. Her parents met in Hungary and emigrated to the U.S. in 1984 through a refugee camp in Italy. She has two sisters and a brother.

Bruckner speaks some Russian and is fluent in Hungarian, having spoken that language since birth. She had studied dance, ballet, and tap since the age of five, intending a career as a dancer. At the age of eight, Bruckner  appeared in a beauty pageant while working as a child model at the suggestion of her mother. Bruckner was raised in the Los Feliz section of Los Angeles until age five, then in Portland, Oregon until age ten, when her family moved to Burbank for her to pursue an acting career in Los Angeles.

Career
Bruckner began her career at age 11. She appeared in commercials, in a few television pilots, and on the daytime soap opera The Bold and the Beautiful as Bridget Forrester from 1997 to 1999. At the age of 15, Bruckner got her first lead role in the independent film Blue Car (2002), in which she played a high school student involved in an affair with her teacher, played by David Strathairn. Film critic Roger Ebert wrote that Bruckner "negotiates this difficult script with complete conviction." Bruckner received an Independent Spirit Award nomination for "Best Female Lead" for the role.

In the 2000s, other minor roles in television and film followed, including roles in the thrillers The Glass House (2001) and the Sandra Bullock vehicle Murder by Numbers (2002). Bruckner has appeared in episodes of the television series 24 and Alias. She starred in the horror films Venom (2005) and The Woods (2006). Also in 2006, she appeared in the drama Peaceful Warrior opposite Scott Mechlowicz and received a ShoWest Female Star of Tomorrow Award and played the lead role in Dreamland.

In 2007, Bruckner appeared in the horror/romance film Blood and Chocolate and later Say Hello to Stan Talmadge (2008), Kill Theory (2008), Vacancy 2: The First Cut (2009),  and  The Craigslist Killer (2011).

On October 3, 2012, Bruckner was cast to play Anna Nicole Smith in a Lifetime original movie The Anna Nicole Story. In 2020, Bruckner played the female lead in ‘’The 11th Green’’.

Personal life
In April 2016, she gave birth to her son.

Filmography

Film

Television

References

External links

20th-century American actresses
21st-century American actresses
American child actresses
American film actresses
American soap opera actresses
American television actresses
Actresses from Los Angeles
Actresses from Portland, Oregon
American people of German descent
American people of Hungarian descent
American people of Russian descent
Living people
People from Los Feliz, Los Angeles
Year of birth missing (living people)